The 1972 United States presidential election in Delaware took place on November 7, 1972. All 50 states and the District of Columbia were part of the 1972 United States presidential election. State voters chose three electors to the Electoral College, who voted for president and vice president.

Delaware was won by the Republican nominees, incumbent President Richard Nixon of California and his running mate Vice President Spiro Agnew of Maryland. Nixon and Agnew defeated the Democratic nominees, Senator George McGovern of South Dakota and his running mate U.S. Ambassador Sargent Shriver of Maryland.

Nixon carried Delaware with 59.60% of the vote to McGovern's 39.18%, a victory margin of 20.42%, which made Delaware almost 3% more Democratic than the nation-at-large.

In the concurrent Senate election in Delaware, incumbent Republican Senator J. Caleb Boggs was unexpectedly defeated for reelection by 29-year-old New Castle County councilman Joe Biden, who would be elected president 48 years later.

Statewide Results

Results by county

See also
 United States presidential elections in Delaware

References

1972
Delaware
1972 Delaware elections